A list of books and essays about Steven Spielberg:

Individual films
Schindler's List

Spielberg, Steven
biblio